Sergei Sergeevich Ogorodnikov (21 January 1986 – 24 June 2018) was a Russian professional ice hockey center. Ogorodnikov most recently played in Poland with the SSA KH Podhale Nowy Targ of the Polska Hokej Liga. Ogorodnikov died on 24 June 2018 as a result of a jet ski accident.

Career
Ogorodnikov was primarily raised in various Moscow based hockey schools including HC Dynamo Moscow and HC CSKA Moscow. He was also a longtime member of Russia's U20 and U18 national Team Russia squads. The New York Islanders drafted him 82nd overall in the 2004 NHL Entry Draft. The young forward came over to North America during the summer of 2006. Ogorodnikov returned to Russia after spending one season with the New York Islanders' minor league affiliates in Pensacola (ECHL) and Bridgeport (AHL), where he continued to play before joining SSA KH Podhale Nowy Targ of the Polska Hokej Liga for the 2017-18 season.

Death
Ogorodnikov died as a result of a jet ski accident on 24 June 2018. He was 32 years old.

Career statistics

Regular season and playoffs

International

References

External links
 
RussianProspects.com Sergei Ogorodnikov Player Profile

1986 births
2018 deaths
Bridgeport Sound Tigers players
Russian ice hockey centres
HC CSKA Moscow players
Salavat Yulaev Ufa players
Metallurg Novokuznetsk players
Pensacola Ice Pilots players
New York Islanders draft picks
Sportspeople from Irkutsk